Proto-Semitic is the hypothetical reconstructed proto-language ancestral to the Semitic languages. There is no consensus regarding the location of the Proto-Semitic Urheimat: scholars hypothesize that it may have originated in the Levant, the Sahara, the Horn of Africa, the Arabian Peninsula, or northern Africa.

The Semitic language family is considered part of the broader macro-family of Afroasiatic languages.

Dating
The earliest attestations of a Semitic language are in Akkadian, dating to around the 24th to 23rd centuries BC (see Sargon of Akkad) and the Eblaite language, but earlier evidence of Akkadian comes from personal names in Sumerian texts from the first half of the third millennium BC. One of the earliest known Akkadian inscriptions was found on a bowl at Ur, addressed to the very early pre-Sargonic king Meskiagnunna of Ur (c. 2485–2450 BC) by his queen Gan-saman, who is thought to have been from Akkad.
The earliest text fragments of West Semitic are snake spells in Egyptian pyramid texts, dated around the mid-third millennium BC.

Proto-Semitic itself must have been spoken before the emergence of its daughters, so some time before the earliest attestation of Akkadian, and sufficiently long so for the changes leading from it to Akkadian to have taken place, which would place it in the fourth millennium BC or earlier.

Urheimat
Since all modern Semitic languages can be traced back to a common ancestor, Semiticists have placed importance on locating the Urheimat of the Proto-Semitic language. The Urheimat of the Proto-Semitic language may be considered within the context of the larger Afro-Asiatic family to which it belongs.

The previously-popular hypothesis of an Arabian Urheimat has been largely abandoned since the region could not have supported massive waves of emigration before the domestication of camels in the 2nd millennium BC.

There is also evidence that Mesopotamia and adjoining areas of modern Syria were originally inhabited by a non-Semitic population. That is suggested by non-Semitic toponyms preserved in Akkadian and Eblaite.

Levant hypothesis 

A Bayesian analysis performed in 2009 suggests an origin for all known Semitic languages in the Levant around 3750 BC, with a later single introduction from South Arabia into the Horn of Africa around 800 BC. This statistical analysis could not, however, estimate when or where the ancestor of all Semitic languages diverged from Afroasiatic. It thus neither contradicts nor confirms the hypothesis that the divergence of ancestral Semitic from Afroasiatic occurred in Africa.

Christopher Ehret has hypothesized that genetic analyses (specifically those of Y chromosome phylogeography and TaqI 49a,f haplotypes) shows populations of proto-Semitic speakers may have moved from the Horn of Africa or southeastern Sahara northwards to the Nile Valley, northwest Africa, the Levant, and Aegean.

North Africa hypothesis 
Edward Lipiński believes that support for an African origin is provided by what he describes as a possible relationship between an early Afroasiatic language and the Niger–Congo languages, whose Urheimat probably lies in Nigeria–Cameroon. According to this theory, the earliest wave of Semitic speakers entered the Fertile Crescent via Israel and Syria and eventually founded the Akkadian Empire. Their relatives, the Amorites, followed them and settled Syria before 2500 BC. Late Bronze Age collapse in Israel led the southern Semites southwards, where they reached the highlands of Yemen after the 20th century BC. Those crossed back to the Horn of Africa between 1500 and 500 BC.

Phonology

Vowels
Proto-Semitic had a simple vowel system, with three qualities *a, *i, *u, and phonemic vowel length, conventionally indicated by a macron: *ā, *ī, *ū. This system is preserved in Akkadian, Ugaritic and Classical Arabic.

Consonants
The reconstruction of Proto-Semitic was originally based primarily on Arabic, whose phonology and morphology (particularly in Classical Arabic) is extremely conservative, and which preserves as contrastive 28 out of the evident 29 consonantal phonemes. As such, Proto-Semitic is generally reconstructed as having the following phonemes (as usually transcribed in Semitology):

The reconstructed phonemes *s *z *ṣ *ś *ṣ́ *ṯ̣, which are shown to be phonetically affricates in the table above, may also be interpreted as fricatives, as discussed below. This was the traditional reconstruction and is reflected in the choice of signs.

The Proto-Semitic consonant system is based on triads of related voiceless, voiced and "emphatic" consonants. Five such triads are reconstructed in Proto-Semitic:
 Dental stops *d *t *ṭ
 Velar stops *g *k *ḳ (normally written *g *k *q)
 Dental sibilants *z *s *ṣ
 Interdental  (written *ḏ *ṯ *ṯ̣)
 Lateral  (normally written *l *ś *ṣ́)

The probable phonetic realization of most consonants is straightforward and is indicated in the table with the International Phonetic Alphabet (IPA). Two subsets of consonants, however, deserve further comment.

Emphatics
The sounds notated here as "emphatic consonants" occur in nearly all Semitic languages as well as in most other Afroasiatic languages, and they are generally reconstructed as glottalization in Proto-Semitic. Thus, *ṭ, for example, represents . See below for the fricatives/affricates.

In modern Semitic languages, emphatics are variously realized as pharyngealized (Arabic, Aramaic, Tiberian Hebrew (such as ), glottalized (Ethiopian Semitic languages, Modern South Arabian languages, such as ), or as tenuis consonants (Turoyo language of Tur Abdin such as ); Ashkenazi Hebrew and Maltese are exceptions and emphatics merge into plain consonants in various ways under the influence of Indo-European languages (Sicilian for Maltese, various languages for Hebrew).

An emphatic labial *ṗ occurs in some Semitic languages, but it is unclear whether it was a phoneme in Proto-Semitic.
While  and  occur mostly in loanwords (especially from Greek), there are many other occurrences whose origin is less clear (such as hepʼä 'strike', häppälä 'wash clothes').
 According to Hetzron, Hebrew developed an emphatic labial phoneme ṗ to represent unaspirated  in Iranian and Greek.

Fricatives
The reconstruction of Proto-Semitic has nine fricative sounds that are reflected usually as sibilants in later languages, but whether all were already sibilants in Proto-Semitic is debated:
 Four voiceless fricatives
  that became  in Hebrew but  in Arabic and /s/ in Geʽez (/θ/ in early Geʽez)
  that became  in Hebrew but  in Arabic and Geʽez
  that became  (transcribed ś) in Hebrew but  in Arabic and /ɬ/ in Geʽez
  that became  in Hebrew, Arabic and Geʽez
 Three emphatic fricatives

The notation given here is traditional and is based on their pronunciation in Hebrew, which has traditionally been extrapolated to Proto-Semitic. However, the older transcription remains predominant in most literature, often even among scholars who either disagree with the traditional interpretation or remain noncommittal.

(Compare Spanish alcalde, from Andalusian Arabic  al-qāḍī "judge".)

The issue of the nature of the "emphatic" consonants, discussed above, is partly related (but partly orthogonal) to the issues here as well.

With respect to the traditional view, there are two dimensions of "minimal" and "maximal" modifications made:
In how many sounds are taken to be affricates. The "minimal affricate" position takes only the emphatic  as an affricate . The "maximal affricate" position additionally posits that  were actually affricates  while  was actually a simple fricative .
In whether to extend the affricate interpretation to the interdentals and laterals. The "minimal extension" position assumes that only the sibilants were affricates, and the other "fricatives" were in fact all fricatives, but the maximal update extends the same interpretation to the other sounds. The "maximal affricate, maximal extension" position assumes not only the "maximal affricate" position for sibilants but also that non-emphatic  were actually affricates.

Affricates in Proto-Semitic were proposed early on but met little acceptance until the work of Alice Faber (1981) who challenged the older approach. The Semitic languages that have survived often have fricatives for these consonants.

The evidence for the various affricate interpretations of the sibilants is direct evidence from transcriptions and structural evidence. However, the evidence for the "maximal extension" positions that extend affricate interpretations to non-sibilant "fricatives" is largely structural because of both the relative rarity of the interdentals and lateral obstruents among the attested Semitic language and the even-greater rarity of such sounds among the various languages in which Semitic words were transcribed. As a result, even when the sounds were transcribed, the resulting transcriptions may be difficult to interpret clearly.

The narrowest affricate view (only  was an affricate ) is the most accepted one. The affricate pronunciation is directly attested in the modern Ethiopic languages and Modern Hebrew, as mentioned above, but also in ancient transcriptions of numerous Semitic languages in various other languages:
 Transcriptions of Ge'ez from the period of the Axumite Kingdom (early centuries AD): ṣəyāmo rendered as Greek τζιαμω tziamō.
Similarly, Old French c  was used to transliterate : Hebrew  "righteousness" and  "land (of Israel)" were written cedek, arec.
 There is also evidence of an affricate in Ancient Hebrew and Phoenician . Punic  was often transcribed as ts or t in Latin and Greek or occasionally Greek ks; correspondingly, Egyptian names and loanwords in Hebrew and Phoenician use  to represent the Egyptian palatal affricate ḏ (conventionally described as voiced  but possibly instead an unvoiced ejective ).
 Aramaic and Syriac had an affricated realization of  until some point, as is seen in Classical Armenian loanwords: Aramaic  'bundle, bunch' → Classical Armenian crar .
 
The "maximal affricate" view, applied only to sibilants, also has transcriptional evidence. According to Kogan, the affricate interpretation of Akkadian  is generally accepted.
 Akkadian cuneiform, as adapted for writing various other languages, used the  signs to represent affricates. Examples include /ts/ in Hittite, Egyptian affricate  in the Amarna letters and the Old Iranian affricates  in Elamite.
 West Semitic loanwords in the "older stratum" of Armenian reflect  as affricates , .
 Greek borrowing of Phoenician 𐤔  to represent /s/ (compare Greek Σ), and 𐤎  to represent  (compare Greek Ξ) is difficult to explain if  then had the value  in Phoenician, but it is quite easy to explain if it actually had the value  (even more so if  had the value ).
 Similarly, Phoenician uses 𐤔  to represent sibilant fricatives in other languages rather than 𐤎  until the mid-3rd century BC, which has been taken by Friedrich/Röllig 1999 (pp. 27–28) as evidence of an affricate pronunciation in Phoenician until then. On the other hand, Egyptian starts using s in place of earlier  to represent Canaanite s around 1000 BC. (A similar interpretation for at least Latin s has been proposed by various linguists based on evidence of similar pronunciations of written s in a number of early medieval Romance languages; a technical term for this "intermediate" sibilant is voiceless alveolar retracted sibilant.) However, it is likely that Canaanite was already dialectally split by that time and the northern, Early Phoenician dialect that the Greeks were in contact with could have preserved the affricate pronunciation until c. 800 BC at least, unlike the more southern Canaanite dialects that the Egyptians were in contact with, so that there is no contradiction.

Examples are that underlying |||| were realized as ss, which is more natural if the law was phonetically |||| → , and that  shift to  before , which is more naturally interpreted as deaffrication.

It has been suggested that it is cross-linguistically rare for languages with a single sibilant fricative to have  as the sound and that  is more likely.

On the other hand, it has been suggested that the initial merged s in Arabic was actually a "hissing-hushing sibilant", presumably something like  (or a "retracted sibilant"), which did not become  until later. Furthermore, there is various evidence to suggest that the sound  for  existed while  was still .

Evidence for the affricate nature of the non-sibilants is based mostly on internal considerations. Ejective fricatives are quite rare cross-linguistically, and when a language has such sounds, it nearly always has  so if  was actually affricate , it would be extremely unusual if  was fricative  rather than affricate . According to Rodinson (1981) and Weninger (1998), the Greek placename Mátlia, with tl used to render Ge'ez ḍ (Proto-Semitic *ṣ́), is "clear proof" that this sound was affricated in Ge'ez and quite possibly in Proto-Semitic as well.

The evidence for the most maximal interpretation, with all the interdentals and lateral obstruents being affricates, appears to be mostly structural: the system would be more symmetric if reconstructed that way.

Some thus suggest that weakened  may have been a separate phoneme in Proto-Semitic.

Prosody
Proto-Semitic is reconstructed as having non-phonemic stress on the third mora counted from the end of the word, i.e. on the second syllable from the end, if it has the structure CVC or CVː (where C is any consonant and V is any vowel), or on the third syllable from the end, if the second one had the structure CV.

Morphophonology 

Proto-Semitic allowed only syllables of the structures CVC, CVː, or CV. It did not permit word-final clusters of two or more consonants, clusters of three or more consonants, hiatus of two or more vowels, or long vowels in closed syllables.

Most roots consisted of three consonants. However, it appears that historically the three-consonant roots had developed from two-consonant ones (this is suggested by evidence from internal as well as external reconstruction). To construct a given grammatical form, certain vowels were inserted between the consonants of the root. There were certain restrictions on the structure of the root: it was impossible to have roots where the first and second consonants were identical, and roots where the first and third consonants were identical were extremely rare.

Correspondence of sounds with daughter languages
See Semitic languages#Phonology for a fuller discussion of the outcomes of the Proto-Semitic sounds in the various daughter languages.

Correspondence of sounds with other Afroasiatic languages
See table at Proto-Afroasiatic language#Consonant correspondences.

Grammar

Nouns 
Three cases are reconstructed: nominative (marked by *-u), genitive (marked by *-i), accusative (marked by *-a)..

There were two genders: masculine (marked by a zero morpheme) and feminine (marked by *-at/*-t and *-ah/-ā). The feminine marker was placed after the root, but before the ending, e.g.: *ba‘l- ‘lord, master’ > *ba‘lat- ‘lady, mistress’, *bin- ‘son’ > *bint- ‘daughter’. Besides, there was a small group of feminine nouns that didn’t have formal markers: *’imm- ‘mother’,  ‘ewe’, *’atān- ‘she-donkey’, *‘ayn- ‘eye’, *birk- ‘knee’

There were three numbers: singular, plural and dual (only in nouns).

There were two ways to mark the plural:
 affixation
 masculine nouns formed their nominative by means of the marker *-ū, their genitive and accusative by *-ī, i.e., by lengthening the vowel of the singular case suffix;
 feminines also formed their plural by lengthening a vowel — namely, by means of the marker *-āt;
 apophonically (by changing the vocalisation pattern of the word, as seen e.g. in Arabic: kātib ‘writer’ — kuttāb ‘writers’) — only in the masculine.

The dual was formed by means of the markers *-ā in the nominative and *-āy in the genitive and accusative.

The endings of the noun:

Pronouns
Like most of its daughter languages, Proto-Semitic has one free pronoun set, and case-marked bound sets of enclitic pronouns. Genitive case and accusative case are only distinguished in the first person.

For many pronouns, the final vowel is reconstructed with long and short positional variants; this is conventionally indicated by a combined macron and breve on the vowel (e.g. ā̆).

The Semitic demonstrative pronouns are usually divided into two series: those showing a relatively close object and those showing a more distant one. Nonetheless, it is very difficult to reconstruct Proto-Semitic forms on the basis of the demonstratives of the individual Semitic languages.

A series of interrogative pronouns are reconstructed for Proto-Semitic: *man ‘who’, *mā ‘what’ and *’ayyu ‘of what kind’ (derived from *’ay ‘where’).

Numerals 
Reconstruction of the cardinal numerals from one to ten (masculine):

All nouns from one to ten were declined as singular nouns with the exception of the numeral ‘two’, which was declined as a dual. Feminine forms of all numbers from one to ten were produced by the suffix *-at. In addition, if the name of the object counted was of the feminine gender, the numbers from 3 to 10 were in the masculine form and vice versa.

The names of the numerals from 11 to 19 were formed by combining the names of the unit digits with the word ‘ten’. Twenty’ was expressed by the dual form of ‘ten’, and the names of the ten digits from 30 to 90 were plural forms of the corresponding unit digits. Besides, Proto-Semitic also had designations for hundred (*mi’t-), thousand (*li’m-) and ten thousand (*ribb-).

Ordinal numerals cannot be reconstructed for the protolanguage because of the great diversity in the descendant languages.

Verb 
Traditionally, two conjugations are reconstructed for Proto-Semitic — a prefix conjugation and a suffix conjugation. According to a hypothesis that has garnered wide support, the prefix conjugation was used with verbs that expressed actions, and the suffix conjugation was used with verbs that expressed states.

The prefix conjugation is reconstructed as follows:

The suffix conjugation is reconstructed as follows:

Verb stems are divided into basic and derived. The basic ones consist of a three-consonant root with thematic vowels. Among the derived ones, one distinguishes stems with a geminated middle consonant, stems with a lengthened first vowel, causative stems (formed by means of the prefix *ša-), nouns with the prefix *na-/*ni-, stems with the suffix *-tV-, stems that consist of a reduplicated biconsonantal root and stems with a geminated final consonant.

From the basic stems, an active participle was formed on the pattern CāCiC, the passive one on the patterns CaCīC and CaCūC.

From the derived stems, the participles were formed by means of the prefix *mu-, while the vocalisation of the active ones was a-i and that of the passive ones was a-a (on this pattern, for example, the Arabic name muḥammad is formed from the root ḥmd ‘to praise’.)

The imperative mood was formed only for the second person, and the form for the singular masculine was the pure stem:

Conjunctions 
Three conjunctions are reconstructed for Proto-Semitic:
 *wa ’and’;
 *’aw ’or’;
 *šimmā ’if’.

Syntax 
The Proto-Semitic language was a language of nominative-accusative alignment, which is preserved in most of its descendant languages.

The basic word order of Proto-Semitic was VSO (verb — subject — direct object), and the modifier usually followed its head.

Lexis 

Reconstruction of the Proto-Semitic lexis provides more information about the life of Proto-Semites and helps in the search for their Urheimat.

Thus, it is possible to reconstruct religious terms ( ‘deity’,  ‘to perform a sacrifice’,  ‘to anoint’,  ‘be holy’,  ‘to forbid, excommunicate’ *ṣalm- ‘idol’), agricultural terms (*ḥaḳl- ‘field’, *ḥrṯ ‘to plough’, *ḏrʻ ‘to sow’, *ʻṣ́d ‘to harvest’, *dyš ‘to thresh’, *ḏrw ‘to winnow’, *gurn- ‘threshing-floor’, *ḥinṭ- ‘wheat’, *kunāṯ- ‘emmer’, *duḫn- ‘millet’), animal husbandry terms (*’immar- ‘ram’, *raḫil- ‘ewe’, *‘inz- ‘goat’, *śaw- ‘a flock of sheep’, *ṣ́a’n- ‘a herd of sheep and goats’,  ‘to shear sheep’, *r‘y ‘to graze (animals)’, *šḳy ‘to guide to a watering place’, *’alp- ‘bull’, *ṯawr- ‘buffalo’, *ḫzr-/*ḫnzr- ‘pig’, *kalb- ‘dog’, *ḥimār- ‘donkey’, *’atān- ‘she-donkey’, *ḥalab- ‘milk’, *lašad- ‘cream’, *ḫim’at- ‘butter’), terms of daily life (*bayt- ‘house’, *dalt- ‘door’, *kussi’- ‘chair’, *‘arś- ‘bed’, *kry ‘to dig’, *bi’r- ‘well’, *śrp ‘to kindle, *’iš- ‘fire’, *ḳly ‘to roast’, *laḥm- ‘food’), technological terms (*ṣrp ‘to smelt’, *paḥḥam- ‘coal’, *kasp- ‘silver’, *kupr- ‘bitumen’, *kuḥl- ‘antimony’, *napṭ- ‘petrol’, *ḥabl- ‘rope’, *ḳašt- ‘bow’, *ḥaṱw- ‘arrow’). Many words are useful for the identification of the Semitic Urheimat (*ti’n- ‘fig’, *ṯūm- ‘garlic’, *baṣal- ‘onion’,  ‘palm tree’, *dibš- ‘date honey’, *buṭn- ‘pistachio’, *ṯaḳid- ‘almond’, *kammūn- ‘cumin’).

Besides, Sergei Starostin adduces several dozens of Semito-Indo-European correspondences, which he considers to be borrowings into Proto-Semitic from Proto-Anatolian or a disappeared branch of Proto-Indo-European.

Comparative vocabulary and reconstructed roots
See List of Proto-Semitic stems (appendix in Wiktionary).

See also
 Afroasiatic languages
 Afroasiatic homeland
 Ancient Semitic-speaking peoples
 History of the Middle East
 Proto-Afroasiatic language
 Proto-Indo-European language

Notes

References

Sources
 
 
 
 
 Huehnergard, John. (2003) "Akkadian ḫ and West Semitic ḥ." Studia Semitica 3, ed. Leonid E. Kogan & Alexander Militarev. Moscow: Russian State University for the Humanities. pp. 102–119. 
 
 Kienast, Burkhart.  (2001). Historische semitische Sprachwissenschaft.

External links

 Semitic etymology
 Semitic Roots Repository

4th-millennium BC establishments
Semitic languages
Semitic linguistics
Semitic